"Doctor Jeep" is a song by The Sisters of Mercy, from their album Vision Thing. It was the second single from the album and was later included on their greatest hits compilation, A Slight Case of Overbombing. The single reached no. 37 on the UK Singles Chart in December 1990.

Critical reception
In review of 5 January 1991 Paul Elliott of Sounds called this song "an inexorable, Olympian noise close to nine minutes of skeletal metal riffing, frosted with keys, Eldritch slurring about everything and nothing" and expressed an opinion that it "won't sound" on radio programs of Dave Lee Travis. Live version of "Knockin' on Heaven's Door" was described "heavy-handed, but no more so than Guns N' Roses."

Track listing 
"Doctor Jeep" written by Andreas Bruhn and Andrew Eldritch, "Knockin' on Heaven's Door" written by Bob Dylan.

7": Merciful Release / MR51

12": Merciful Release / MR51T

12" Limited: Merciful Release / MR51TX

CD: Merciful Release / MR51CD

Charts

References

External links
 Doctor Jeep video on youtube

1990 singles
The Sisters of Mercy songs
Songs written by Andrew Eldritch
1990 songs
East West Records singles